The Vultee XP-54 Swoose Goose was a prototype fighter built by the Vultee Aircraft Company for the United States Army Air Forces (USAAF).

Design and development
Vultee submitted a proposal in response to a U.S. Army Air Corps request for an unusual configuration. The Vultee design won the competition, beating the Curtiss XP-55 Ascender and the Northrop XP-56 Black Bullet. Vultee designated it Model 84, a descendant of their earlier Model 78. After completing preliminary engineering and wind tunnel tests, a contract for a prototype was awarded on 8 January 1941. A second prototype was ordered on 17 March 1942. Although it appeared to be a radical design, performance was lackluster, and the project was canceled.

The XP-54 was designed with a pusher engine in the aft part of the fuselage. The tail was mounted rearward between two mid-wing booms, with the twelve-foot propeller between them. The design included a "ducted wing section" developed by the NACA to potentially enable installation of cooling radiators and intercoolers in the inverted gull wing. The Pratt & Whitney X-1800 engine was proposed as the powerplant, but after its development was discontinued the liquid-cooled Lycoming XH-2470 was substituted.

In September 1941, the XP-54 mission was changed from low-altitude to high-altitude interception. Consequently, a turbo-supercharger and heavier armor was added, and empty weight increased to 18,000 lb (5,200 to 8,200 kg).

The XP-54 was unique in numerous ways. The pressurized cockpit required a complex entry system: the pilot's seat acted as an elevator for cockpit access from the ground. The pilot lowered the seat electrically, sat in it, and raised it into the cockpit. Bail-out procedure was complicated by the pressurization system, necessitating a downward ejection of the pilot and seat to clear the propeller arc. Also, the nose section could pivot through the vertical, three degrees up and six degrees down. In the nose, two 37 mm T-9 cannon were in rigid mounts while two .50 cal machine guns were in movable mounts. Movement of the nose and machine guns was controlled by a special compensating gun sight. Thus, the cannon trajectory could be elevated without altering the flight attitude of the airplane. The large nose section gave rise to its whimsical nickname, the Swoose Goose, inspired by a song about Alexander who was half-swan and half-goose: "Alexander was a swoose." – a name shared with the oldest surviving B-17.

Operational history
Flight tests of the first prototype, 41-1210,  began on 15 January 1943. Trials showed performance to be substantially below guarantees. Simultaneously, development of the XH-2470 engine was discontinued. Although the Allison V-3420 engine could be substituted, that required substantial airframe changes. Projected delay and costs resulted in a decision to not consider production buys.

The prototypes continued to be used in an experimental program until problems with the Lycoming engines and lack of spare parts caused termination. The second prototype, 42-108994 (but mistakenly painted as 42-1211) equipped with an experimental GE supercharger, made ten flights before it was relegated to a "parts plane" to keep the first prototype in the air.

Specifications (XP-54)

See also

Notes

Bibliography
 Balzer, Gerald H. American Secret Pusher Fighters of World War II: XP-54, XP-55, and XP-56. North Branch, Minnesota: Specialty Press, 2008. .
 Green, William and Gordon Swanborough. WW2 Aircraft Fact Files: US Army Air Force Fighters, Part 2. London: Macdonald and Jane's Publishers Ltd., 1978. .
 Jenkins, Dennis R. and Tony R. Landis. Experimental & Prototype U.S. Air Force Jet Fighters. North Branch, Minnesota: Specialty Press, 2008. .
 Thompson, Jonathan. Vultee Aircraft 1932–1947. Santa Ana, CA: Narkiewicz/Thompson, 1992. .

External links

 USAAF Resource Center – Vultee XP-54

XP-54
Vultee P-54
Twin-boom aircraft
Inverted gull-wing aircraft
Single-engined pusher aircraft
Cancelled military aircraft projects of the United States
Aircraft first flown in 1943